Gabriel Ruelas, (born on July 23, 1970 in Yerbabuena, Jalisco, Mexico), is a Mexican former professional boxer.

Professional career
Ruelas turned pro in 1988 and in 1993 challenged WBC Super Featherweight Title holder Azumah Nelson, losing a close majority decision.
In 1994 he was able to capture the title by outpointing Jesse James Leija. He defended the belt twice, including an 11th round TKO of Jimmy Garcia of Colombia, who later died from his injuries. Ruelas contemplated retirement after Garcia's death, however, he decided to continue, promising to donate some of his earnings to the Garcia family. Ruelas later reflected that he was never the same fighter following that incident. His fight with Garcia was an undercard to his brother's (Rafael Ruelas) lost title fight with Oscar De La Hoya. Ruelas lost his title in a rematch to Nelson in 1995, via TKO in the 5th. In 1997 he took on hard-hitting Arturo Gatti for the IBF Super Featherweight Title but was TKO'd in the 5th. The fifth round of this bout was chosen as Ring Magazine's Round of the Year for 1997. The fight itself was also named "Fight of the Year" by the same magazine.

Ruelas retired in 2003 after losing to Courtney Burton. Gabriel's brother, Rafael (also a professional boxer) and relative Guillermo U. Ruelas, all attended Poly Technic High School in Sun Valley, California.

Professional boxing record

Honours
2006 California Boxing Hall of Fame Inductee.

See also
List of WBC world champions
List of Mexican boxing world champions

References

External links

1970 births
Living people
Mexican emigrants to the United States
American boxers of Mexican descent
Boxers from Jalisco
American male boxers
Super-featherweight boxers
World boxing champions